Rinder is a German language occupational surname, which means "cattle farmer", from the German word Rind, meaning a cow. The name may refer to:

Alexandra Rinder (born 1998), German bodyboarder
Frederick Rinder (1858–1938), British sports administrator
Friedl Rinder (1905–2001), German chess player
Lawrence Rinder (born 1961), American curator
Mike Rinder (born 1955), Australian religious leader
Robert Rinder (born 1978), British lawyer
Walter Rinder (born 1934), American writer

German-language surnames